Adnan Kovačević (born 9 September 1993) is a Bosnian professional footballer who plays as a centre-back for Nemzeti Bajnokság I club Ferencváros and the Bosnia and Herzegovina national team.

Kovačević started his professional career at Travnik, before joining Sarajevo in 2013. Four years later, he moved to Korona Kielce. In 2020, he signed with Ferencváros.

A former youth international for Bosnia and Herzegovina, Kovačević made his senior international debut in 2019, earning 11 caps since.

Club career

Early career
Kovačević started playing football at a local club, before joining Travnik's youth setup in 2008. He made his professional debut against Borac Banja Luka on 19 May 2011 at the age of 17. On 28 May, he scored his first professional goal against Olimpic.

In July 2013, Kovačević switched to Sarajevo. In July 2016, he suffered a severe knee injury, which was diagnosed as anterior cruciate ligament tear and was ruled out for at least six months.

In July 2017, he moved to Polish side Korona Kielce.

Ferencváros
In July 2020, Kovačević signed a three-year contract with Hungarian outfit Ferencváros. He made his official debut for the team in UEFA Champions League qualifier against Djurgården on 19 August. Two weeks later, he made his league debut against Zalaegerszeg.

Kovačević debuted in UEFA Champions League away at Barcelona on 20 October.

He won his first trophy with the club on 20 April 2021, when they were crowned league champions.

International career
Kovačević was a member of Bosnia and Herzegovina under-21 team under coach Vlado Jagodić.

In August 2019, he received his first senior call-up, for UEFA Euro 2020 qualifiers against Liechtenstein and Armenia, but had to wait until 12 October to make his debut against Finland.

Personal life
Kovačević married his long-time girlfriend Edna in December 2020. Together they have a son named Dal.

Career statistics

Club

International

Honours
Sarajevo
Bosnian Premier League: 2014–15
Bosnian Cup: 2013–14

Ferencváros
Nemzeti Bajnokság I: 2020–21, 2021–22
Magyar Kupa: 2021–22

References

External links

1993 births
Living people
People from Kotor Varoš
Bosniaks of Bosnia and Herzegovina
Bosnia and Herzegovina Muslims
Bosnia and Herzegovina footballers
Bosnia and Herzegovina under-21 international footballers
Bosnia and Herzegovina international footballers
Bosnia and Herzegovina expatriate footballers
Association football central defenders
NK Travnik players
FK Sarajevo players
Korona Kielce players
Ferencvárosi TC footballers
Premier League of Bosnia and Herzegovina players
Ekstraklasa players
Nemzeti Bajnokság I players
Expatriate footballers in Poland
Expatriate footballers in Hungary
Bosnia and Herzegovina expatriate sportspeople in Poland
Bosnia and Herzegovina expatriate sportspeople in Hungary